André LeBlanc may refer to:
 André LeBlanc (DC Comics), an American comic books character
 André LeBlanc (artist), Haitian comic books artist